Young Conservation Area, formerly named Hilda Young Conservation Area, consisting of , is located in the north central portion of Jefferson County, Missouri.

Geography 

History 
The area was acquired through a donation and purchase by the Missouri Department of Conservation in 1986.

Features 
The area is about 93 percent forested with oak, maple, hickory, and other native species. White-tailed deer, wild turkeys, and squirrels are abundant. LaBarque Creek, glades, tree plantations, and open fields provide diverse wildlife habitat.

The plantations on the area include a  Austrian pine grove and a  black walnut grove. 

The  Taconic Loop Trail winds along LaBarque Creek, and there are two man-made fishing ponds stocked with bass and bluegill. Hunting is permitted. Bow hunting is permitted in season. Single-projectile firearms are not allowed.

Young Conservation Area is open daily from 4:00 a.m. to 10:00 p.m. The area is recommended for hunting, fishing, nature study, outdoor photography, picnicking and frogging (in season). Free-running pets are not allowed. No camping, horseback riding, target shooting, open fires, or swimming is permitted.

Nearby attractions 
Nearby Missouri Department of Conservation areas include LaBarque Creek, Myron and Sonya Glassberg Family Conservation Area, Rockwoods Reservation, Rockwoods Range, Forest 44, Pacific Palisades Conservation Area, Allenton Access, Catawissa Conservation Area, and August A. Busch Memorial Conservation Area.

References

Protected areas of Jefferson County, Missouri
Protected areas established in 1986
Conservation Areas of Missouri
1986 establishments in Missouri